Ritual Maxakalí (also referred to as "Old Maxakalí") is a ritual language belonging to the Maxakalían language family of eastern Brazil. It is used in ritual songs sung by the Maxakali. Spoken Maxakalí is different from the variety used in the Maxakalí ritual songs, though both are classified as Maxakalían languages. It is more closely related to other extinct Maxakalían languages such as Makoní than to modern spoken Maxakalí. It is also closely related to Monoxó, Kapoxó, Kumanaxó, Panhame, and other extinct varieties.

References

Maxakalían languages
Ritual languages
Languages of Brazil